α-Ketoadipic acid (or 2-oxoadipate) is an intermediate in the metabolism of lysine.

See also
 Homoisocitrate dehydrogenase

References

Dicarboxylic acids
Alpha-keto acids